PARP may refer to:
 Poly ADP ribose polymerase, an enzyme
 Procyclic acidic repetitive protein, a type of protein in Trypanosoma parasites
 Parp (onomatopoeic), a sound